"" (Come, Creator Spirit, visit us) is a Christian hymn in German for Pentecost. The text is a paraphrase of the Latin hymn  by Heinrich Bone. The melody is an adaptation of the Latin hymn's plainchant. It was first published in 1845. In the Catholic hymnal Gotteslob, it is GL 351.

History 
 is one of many paraphrases of the 9th-century  which is attributed to Rabanus Maurus. The first version in German was Martin Luther's ", published in 1524. Bone's version, in six stanzas as the model, was first published in 1845. It was part of his 1847 hymnal Cantate!. The hymn was included in the first edition of the common German Catholic hymnal Gotteslob in 1975 as GL 245, and is stanza, GL 351 in its 2013 edition, in the section Pentecost / Holy Spirit.

Text

Tune

Notes

References

External links 
 Komm, Schöpfer Geist, kehr bei uns ein (in German) evangeliums.net
 
 Komm, Schöpfer Geist, kehr bei uns ein johann-paul-zehetbauer.de

Catholic hymns in German
1845 songs
19th-century hymns in German
Hymns for Pentecost